Xiqi is an unclassified Loloish language of Huaning County, Yunnan, China. It is also called Siqipo 斯期颇 in Mile County.

Classification
Pelkey (2011:431) suggests that the Xiqi, Ati, and Long languages of Huaning County may be Southeastern Loloish languages. Hsiu (2018) suggests a Northern Loloish affiliation.

Distribution
The Huaning County Gazetteer 华宁县志 (1994:514) lists the following locations of Xiqi.
Tonghongdian Township 通红甸乡: Suomeizao 所梅早村, Dapozuo 大婆左村
Panxi Township 盘溪乡: Yide 矣得村, Fagao 法高村, Dayaxi 大丫喜村, Longtanying 龙潭营村
Chengjiao Township 城郊乡: Dengloushan 登楼山, Puchazhai 普茶寨
Huaxi Township 华溪乡: Xishajing 西沙井村, Dujia 独家村
Qinglong Township 青龙镇: Shanqi 山歧村, Qize 起则村

Vocabulary
The Huaning County Ethnic Gazetteer (1992:72) provides a short word list of Adu, Ati, Xiqi, Nong, and Azhe transcribed using Chinese characters, shown below. Pinyin transliterations have also been provided below.

References

Loloish languages
Languages of China